Tips Industries Limited is an Indian music record label and film production, film promotion, and film distribution company in Mumbai, Maharashtra, India. It was founded by Kumar S. Taurani and Ramesh S. Taurani in 1975. Its distributors serve more than 1,000 wholesalers and 400,000 retailers across India.

History

In 1975, the Taurani brothers used to trade in LP’s (Long Playing Phonograph Records) for three of the biggest companies in India – HMV, Music India & CBS. By 1977, they had become the biggest dealers for these companies in Western India.  Today, Tips also handles film production.

Filmography

Films produced
This is a list of films produced by Tips owners Kumar Taurani and Ramesh Taurani:

Other films distributed

Discography

Hindi films

Original

Coolie No. 1 (2020)
Yuvvraaj (2008)
Ramaiya Vastavaiya (2013)
Tere Naal Love Ho Gaya (2012)
Race (2008)
Prince (2010)
Ajab Prem Ki Ghazab Kahani (2009)
Kismat Konnection (2008)
Race 2  (2013) 
Race 3  (2018)
Kaanchi (2014)

Time Magnetics (acquired)

Weston Musicassettes (acquired)

Tamil films
Dheena (2001)
Samrat Asoka (2001)
Kannathil Muthamittal (2002)
Vedham (2002)
Azhagiya Pandipuram (2014)
Thottal Thodarum (2014)
Thilagar (2015)
Vaaitha (2022)
Kaalangalil Aval Vasantham (2022)
Ponniyin Selvan: I (2022)
Desiya Thalaivar (2023)
D3 (2023)
Aaragan (2023)
Saamaniyan (2023)
Parunthaaguthu Oorkuruvi (2023)
Single Shankarum Smartphone Simranum (2023)
Telugu films
Hari Hara Veera Mallu (2023)
Shaakuntalam (2023)
Malayalam films
Pathonpatham Noottandu (2022)

Partners

Publicity Partners
 MTV

TV & Media Partner
 Disney Star
 Culver Max Entertainment

Online Partner
 Disney+ Hotstar
 Netflix
 Amazon

See also
 T-Series
 Saregama
 Ishtar Music
 Zee Music Company
 Sony Music India
 Universal Music India
 Times Music

References

External links
 

Indian music record labels
Film production companies based in Mumbai
Music production companies
Indian companies established in 1975
Music companies of India
1975 establishments in Maharashtra
Mass media companies established in 1975
Companies listed on the National Stock Exchange of India
Companies listed on the Bombay Stock Exchange